WINE (940 kHz) is a commercial AM radio station broadcasting a classic rock format, simulcast from WRKI (95.1 FM) until January 2023. Licensed to Brookfield, Connecticut, it serves the Danbury area.  The station is owned by Townsquare Media.

By day, WINE transmits with 680 watts, but because 940 AM is a Canadian and Mexican clear channel frequency, WINE reduces power at night to only four watts to avoid interference.  The station's transmitter is on Carmen Hill Road in Brookfield.

History
On , WINE signed on the air.  Originally it was a daytimer, required to go off the air at sunset.  It was simulcast with co-owned FM station 95.1 WGHF, which had gone on the air in 1957.  Later, the FM station began using the same call sign as the AM station, WINE-FM.  In the 1970s and early 1980s WINE-AM-FM were Top 40 stations.  When the AM had to go off the air, WINE-FM continued playing the Top 40 hits at night.  By the 1980s, WINE 940 became a full-service, adult contemporary station, while the FM station became album rock outlet WRKI.

In the 1990s, WINE became part of an all-news network that included WNLK 1350 AM in Norwalk, Connecticut.  Both became news/talk a few years later. After being sold to Cumulus Media, WINE spent a few years as an adult standards station, along with now-defunct sister station WPUT 1510 AM in Brewster, New York.

Both WINE and WPUT switched to an all sports format.  At first it was part of the ESPN Radio Network.  They switched to CBS Sports Radio on January 2, 2013. WINE's nighttime signal is very weak at 4 watts. WPUT operated daytime only.

WINE's longtime competitor is 800 AM WLAD in Danbury. WLAD is now a talk radio station. In addition to WRKI, WINE has a second FM sister station, Patterson, New York's WDBY, which has a booster station in Danbury.

On August 30, 2013, a deal was announced in which Townsquare Media would acquire 53 Cumulus stations, including WINE, for $238 million. The deal was part of Cumulus' acquisition of Dial Global; Townsquare and Dial Global were both controlled by Oaktree Capital Management. The sale to Townsquare was completed on November 14, 2013.

The station lost its CBS Sports Radio affiliation in June 2021, and for several weeks, went dark, before returning with a simulcast of WRKI to retain the license.

In January 2023, WINE went silent.

References

External links

FCC History Cards for WINE

Brookfield, Connecticut
INE
Radio stations established in 1964
1964 establishments in Connecticut
Townsquare Media radio stations